Barry DeKay is a member of the Nebraska Legislature for District 40 from Niobrara, Nebraska. He was elected to the Nebraska Legislature on November 8, 2022.

Electoral history

References

Republican Party Nebraska state senators
21st-century American politicians
Living people
1959 births
People from Knox County, Nebraska